Tianschaniella is a genus of flowering plants belonging to the family Boraginaceae.

Its native range is Central Asia.

Species:
 Tianschaniella umbellulifera B.Fedtsch.

References

Boraginaceae
Boraginaceae genera